Warlock is a fictional character appearing in American comic books published by Marvel Comics.

Publication history
Warlock was introduced in New Mutants #18 (Aug 1984) and was created by Chris Claremont and Bill Sienkiewicz. He joined the titular superteam in issue #21, and remained a part of the cast until his death in issue #95.

Warlock briefly starred in his own self-titled series for nine issues from 1999 to 2000, written by Louise Simonson (who had previously been responsible for killing off the original Technarchy Warlock) and drawn by Paschalis Ferry.

Fictional character biography

New Mutant
Warlock is a Technarchy, a race of mechanical organisms that survive by infecting living creatures with the "techno-organic" transmode virus, before draining the life energy ("lifeglow") of the infected organism. Unlike others of his race, Warlock possesses a distinctive degree of compassion, and as a result was dubbed a mutant in spirit; it was later discovered that he is in fact a mutant of his race even though he has yet to display any abilities beyond those natural to the Technarch. He is the son of the Technarch ruler who has battled the New Mutants and the X-Men. Warlock served as a member of the original New Mutants for much of that group's existence, and became the best friend of his teammate Cypher (Doug Ramsey).

Because of Warlock's compassion, he refuses to drain other sentient creatures of their "lifeglow". Because of the difficulty in determining whether or not a creature is sentient, New Mutants leader Danielle Moonstar ordered him not to drain any large creatures without permission; however, Warlock often drains such creatures at his discretion when Danielle is not present.

During many adventures, Warlock would team up with Doug, keeping his teammate safe. Though the two often worked together to confront enemies, Warlock's constant protection only served to lessen Doug's self-esteem.

His shape-shifting abilities led him into a confrontation with the Impossible Man. This soon snowballed into an Earth-threatening incident as both entities tried to outdo each other. This only ended when Warlock showcased his ability to change color, something which the Impossible Man could not do.

Doug's death at the hands of the Ani-Mator devastated Warlock, leading him to go so far as to steal Doug's body. With the help of the rest of the New Mutants, he came to terms with Doug's death (and returned his friend's body to the rightful place). He continued to serve with the team, which led to a second trip to Asgard. Warlock and two new friends Boom Boom and Hrimhari became separated from the rest. They traveled to Asgard together. They were "rescued" from imprisonment by the children of Volstagg who sent them to talk with the mighty being Tiwaz. The trio eventually joined with a force to rescue the ruler of Asgard from an assassination attempt.

During the crisis known as Inferno, Warlock's shape-shifting skills became vital in neutralizing the demonic threats.

Warlock was kidnapped from the grounds of the X-Mansion, along with his friends Rictor, Boom Boom and Wolfsbane, and ended up on the island nation of Genosha which was ruled by Cameron Hodge. Warlock was killed in an attempt by Hodge to steal his powers. The news of his death was broadcast worldwide, a public relations disaster for Genosha since the world believed Warlock to be a "normal" human mutant. Wolfsbane asked Boom Boom to put Warlock's ashes on Doug's grave.

Warlock had a distinctive way of talking during his stint in the New Mutants comics, frequently referring to himself with the personal pronoun "self". Though he initially refers to teammates with their first names or normal pronouns, he later begins referring to them as "friends", and eventually as "selffriends". An exception is Danielle Moonstar who, likely due to leadership of the New Mutants, he calls "chiefriend". Doug, after offering his own life energy to keep Warlock alive during a mission in Asgard, earned the unique honorific title of "selfsoulfriend".

Douglock

Later, a group of humans called the Phalanx appeared. This group had been mutated into techno-organic forms via the transmode virus, which had been extracted from Warlock's ashes. One of the Phalanx was Douglock, a lookalike of Doug Ramsey who had all of Doug's memories. This entity gained independence with the assistance of the robotic Zero. Douglock joined the European mutant superhero team Excalibur. At that time the team was based on Muir Island, which was owned and run by Moira MacTaggert. While his team-mates were unnerved by his similarity to Doug, Douglock was eventually accepted as his own person. He acted as a tutor to Meggan and enjoyed a brief romance with teammate Wolfsbane, foster daughter to Moira. This romance would cause him to react irrationally and dangerously at times, mainly destroying valuable scientific research because he did not understand it was more important than his budding relationship with Wolfsbane.

In a bid to seize control of the UK, the covert intelligence operation, Black Air allied themselves with the London Branch of the Hellfire Club in order to raise an ancient demon from its crypt below London and use the ensuing chaos to their advantage. Black Air kidnapped Douglock to be used as the conduit to the crypt. However, after being lost in the time stream Captain Britain spent some time in an alternate timeline where Black Air was successful in its plans, leading to a dystopic future. Using this knowledge he and Excalibur were able to defuse the Hellfire Club, enter Black Air's HQ, rescue Douglock, and stop the demon's resurrection.

Douglock would continue to mishandle other aspects of Earthly life. Despite his beliefs he could handle it, Douglock became inebriated during Captain Britain's bachelor party and passed out, and later experienced temporary memory problems as a result.

Return as Warlock
It was later revealed that Douglock is actually a reanimated Warlock who had been given Doug's memories. He then reverts to the name of Warlock and begins a career as a solo adventurer.  During his adventures, Warlock is joined by a young girl, Hope, who can infect others with the techno-organic virus without being affected by it herself. Hope has a pet monkey that had been physically affected by the virus also. They are later joined by a novice psychic Psimon, whose group of allies combated techno-organic threats. Early in their adventures, they confront Spider-Man, team up with Shadowcat, cause trouble for Iron Man, and fight against the villain Psycho-Man.

Warlock briefly fell under the control of the Red Skull when the Skull's desperate use of a Cosmic Cube took him somewhere safe where he could gain power over others, this wish taking him to Warlock's location, where he was able to force Warlock to help him take control of a SHIELD helicarrier and the agents on board. Fortunately, Nick Fury, Shadowcat, Nightcrawler and Colossus were able to infiltrate the helicarrier, and Warlock was able to use his connection to the ship to activate the currently-captive Machine Man. He attempted to stop the Skull by programming the also-captive Deathlok to kill him (unable to make Deathlok kill the Skull himself as that would go against his current programming), but Kitty delayed this long enough for Fury to destroy the Skull's control unit, although the Skull got away with a group of independently programmed agents in a damaged Helicarrier.

Warlock later heads back to his home on Muir Island where he becomes re-acquainted with his old flame Wolfsbane and her adoptive mother, Moira MacTaggert.

An altered form of Bastion attacks the island. Hope, Psimon and Wolfsbane join Warlock's efforts to defeat this new threat. Later, all would travel to New York and assist the Avengers in defeating Warlock's father, the Magus.

Nova

When Nova (Richard Rider) was searching for a cure for his Phalanx infection, he arrived on the Technarchy homeworld Kvch. Nova finds the only living beings are Warlock and his adopted charge, Tyro. Warlock gave Tyro his non-aggressive form of the transmode virus, and is raising Tyro in hopes that he can slowly but surely change Technarch society into a more benevolent and peaceful one. He also reveals that he cannot cure Nova, let alone stop the Phalanx infection, as doing so would kill him, and he cannot give up on the Technarchy. At that same time however, Gamora and Drax appear on the homeworld, and the Phalanx virus transforms them into a Babel Spire, which summons an adult Technarch Siredam.

Warlock is forced to desperate measures: to ensure Tyro's safety, he sends him away, using all of his lifeglow to purge from Nova the transmode virus. Warlock's dying wish is for Nova to hold back the Siredam, coming to challenge Tyro, giving the youngling enough time to escape. However Tyro comes back, stricken by his surrogate father's sacrifice, and gambles his life in an attempt to "reprogram" the Siredam's body — and all of its Lifeglow reserves. Now in possession of a Siredam's form and cosmic level abilities, Tyro is able to spare some of his inestimable Lifeglow reserves to resurrect Warlock. Warlock then agrees to help Nova in his battle against Ultron and the Phalanx, and as Tyro before, gambles that his mutant strain of the transmode virus could be able to disrupt the Phalanx strain, and purges Ultron out of Adam Warlock's body, allowing for his ultimate defeat. Along with Tyro and Wraith, he stays in the former Phalanx zones to heal infected people with Tyro's lifeglow and Wraith's exolons.

Return to Earth
Warlock returns to Earth where H.A.M.M.E.R. agents launch A.I. missiles at him. He takes control of the missiles and flies to his former home at the X-Mansion. There, he finds an old photo from his New Mutants days amongst the rubble. He then goes to Doug Ramsey's grave to find it has been dug up and his body missing.

Necrosha
Warlock discovers the New Mutants fighting a resurrected Doug Ramsey, who is under orders from Selene to destroy them. He intervenes and tries to speak to his self-soul-friend. Warlock detects malicious techno-organic malware present in Doug, and attempts to "defragment" Doug's software. During the process, he re-awakens some of Doug's memories from his days with the team before and up to his time of death. However, Warlock himself is infected by a Trojan-like virus and begins to lose control. Doug, still under Selene's influence, takes advantage of Warlock's vulnerability and decapitates Warlock. He then throws Warlock's severed head into the nearby ocean. There, small crustaceans are drawn to the head. Once they are in range, Warlock, still alive, absorbs their life energy, and is, after some time, able to escape his watery grave.

Warlock returns to the battle only to find that resurrected members of once-deceased Hellions have arrived and have captured Doug Ramsey. The Hellions attempt to reprogram Doug by "deleting" the memories of his old self so that he may once again become Selene's obedient pawn. Warlock, along with the help of other New Mutant team members, rescues Doug and defeats the Hellions.

Second Coming
After the return of the mutant messiah, Hope Summers, and Cable to the mainstream timeline, Bastion and his members of the Human Council attacked her tirelessly. Cyclops ordered the New Mutants to attack one of Cameron Hodge's Right facilities, where Doug convinced Warlock to absorb Cameron Hodge and his soldiers' lifeglow to save his friends, and then to aid Cable and a group of X-Men from William Stryker and his Purifiers. The event of taking Hodge's life deeply scarred Warlock and after the event, he purged the lifeglow he harvested from Hodge's men and felt uncomfortable watching his team consume food, as the meaning for him had changed drastically. After the attack from Bastion, the team took a vacation and Illyana sensed that Pixie had been captured. Illyana sent Warlock to warn the X-Men. After surviving an attack in Limbo by demons and the Elder Gods, it was revealed that Illyana brought Legion back into the mainstream reality to use against the Elder Gods that General Ulysses and Project Purgatory were planning to unleash. Warlock was later asked, by Cyclops, to monitor police feeds around the world for crimes that were above the efforts of the local police, but under the radar of heroes such as the Avengers.

Other versions

Exiles
The reality-hopping Exiles once visited a world where Doug Ramsey was infected by the Legacy Virus. Trying to save Ramsey's life, Warlock bonded with him, combining their life forces into one. Once the virus was introduced to Warlock's physiology, it mutates and becomes even more contagious. With over half the world infected by this new technological virus (called Vi-Locks), Doug Ramsey is kept in stasis. He is killed by one of the infected, once it discovers the Exiles are trying to create a cure based on Ramsey's original strain of the virus.

Ultimate Marvel
Warlock makes a cameo appearance in one issue, where he is seen fighting the X-Men in a gigantic form. However, this serves primarily as an in-joke.

In other media

Television
Warlock appears in X-Men: The Animated Series, voiced by David Corbain. This version's story was altered so that he actually came to Earth in an effort to escape his destiny of merging with the Phalanx. He and his Life-Mate (voiced by Susan Roman) crashed on Earth; he escaped the wreckage, his Life-Mate did not and gets captured by the villainous Cameron Hodge to recreate the Phalanx on Earth. A central character during the two-part "Phalanx Covenant" episode, he assists Beast and others to stop this techno-organic threat. After he volunteered himself to be assimilated with the cure and defeat the Phalanx infestation, Warlock's Life-Mate returns to normal and they both left Earth to return to their home world to influence the Phalanx for the better.

Film
Warlock was originally slated to appear in the film New Mutants as a member of the team along with Magik, Wolfsbane, Cannonball, Mirage and Sunspot but was removed from the final draft. The film's co-writer and director Josh Boone revealed in an interview with Nerdist that Sacha Baron Cohen was in talks to played Warlock in voice and in motion capture.

Video games
Warlock is a playable character in the video game Marvel: Contest of Champions (2014).

Toys
Warlock was featured as the Build-a-Figure in the spring 2017 X-Men wave of Marvel Legends action figures.

References

External links
 UncannyXmen.net Spotlight on Warlock
 Warlock at Marvel Wiki

Characters created by Bill Sienkiewicz
Characters created by Chris Claremont
Comics characters introduced in 1984
Marvel Comics aliens
Marvel Comics characters who are shapeshifters
Marvel Comics extraterrestrial superheroes
Marvel Comics male superheroes
Marvel Comics mutants
New Mutants
X-Factor (comics)